A philosophical zombie or p-zombie argument is a thought experiment in philosophy of mind that imagines a hypothetical being that is physically identical to and indistinguishable from a normal person, considered as having qualia, but does not have conscious experience, qualia. For example, if a philosophical zombie were poked with a sharp object it would not inwardly feel any pain qualia, yet it would outwardly behave exactly as if it did feel pain, including verbally expressing pain. Relatedly, a zombie world is a hypothetical world indistinguishable from our world (considered to include beings that have conscious experience) but in which all beings lack conscious experience.

Philosophical zombie arguments are used in support of mind-body dualism against forms of physicalism such as materialism, behaviorism and functionalism. These arguments aim to resist the possibility of any physicalist solution to or rejection of the so-called "hard problem of consciousness" (the problem of accounting for subjective, intrinsic, first-person, what-it's-like-ness). Proponents of philosophical zombie arguments, such as the philosopher David Chalmers, argue that since a philosophical zombie is by definition physically identical to a conscious person (considered to consciously experience qualia), even its logical possibility would refute physicalism, because it would establish the existence of conscious experience of qualia as a further fact. Such arguments have been criticized by many philosophers. Some physicalists like Daniel Dennett argue that philosophical zombies are logically incoherent and thus impossible, or that all humans are philosophical zombies; other physicalists like Christopher Hill argue that philosophical zombies are coherent but not metaphysically possible.

History
Philosophical zombies are associated with David Chalmers, but it was philosopher Robert Kirk who first used the term "zombie" in this context in 1974. Prior to that, Keith Campbell made a similar argument in his 1970 book Body and Mind, using the term "Imitation Man." Chalmers further developed and popularized the idea in his work. In his 1911 Oxford "Life and consciousness" Lectures, Henri Bergson already argues to his audience that it is impossible to prove with mathematical certainty that he is in fact an I, a creature enstowed with consciousness: "I might be a well constructed automaton - going, coming, speaking - without internal consciousness, and the very words by which I declare at this moment that I am conscious being might be words pronounced without conciousness."(Bergson, 1911). Bergson proceeds to argue that we infer from analogy between this other being and ourselves. Following this thought experiment further, Bergson proceeds to argue against the idea that conciousness is restricted to the brain - which he conceives as an organ of choice -, but instead resides in the whole body. (Bergson, 1911)

There has been a lively debate about what the zombie argument shows. Critics who primarily argue that zombies are not conceivable include Daniel Dennett (although he has also claimed at least once that all humans are philosophical zombies), Nigel J. T. Thomas, David Braddon-Mitchell, and Robert Kirk; critics who assert mostly that conceivability does not entail possibility include Katalin Balog, Keith Frankish, Christopher Hill, and Stephen Yablo; and critics who question the logical validity of the argument include George Bealer.

In his 2019 update to the article on philosophical zombies in the Stanford Encyclopedia of Philosophy, Kirk summed up the current state of the debate:

A 2013 survey of professional philosophers conducted by Bourget and Chalmers produced the following results: 

In 2020, the same survey yielded "inconceivable" 16%, "conceivable but not possible" 37%, "metaphysically possible" 24%, and "other" 23%.

Types of zombies
Though philosophical zombies are widely used in thought experiments, the detailed articulation of the concept is not always the same. P-zombies were introduced primarily to argue against specific types of physicalism such as behaviorism, according to which mental states exist solely as behavior. Belief, desire, thought, consciousness, and so on, are only behavior (whether external behavior or internal behavior) or tendencies towards behaviors. A p-zombie that is behaviorally indistinguishable from a normal human being but lacks conscious experiences is therefore not logically possible according to the behaviorist, so an appeal to the logical possibility of a p-zombie furnishes an argument that behaviorism is false. Proponents of zombie arguments generally accept that p-zombies are not physically possible, while opponents necessarily deny that they are metaphysically or, in some cases, even logically possible.

The unifying idea of the zombie is that of a human completely lacking conscious experience. It is possible to distinguish various zombie sub-types used in different thought experiments as follows:

 A behavioral zombie that is behaviorally indistinguishable from a human.
 A neurological zombie that has a human brain and is generally physiologically indistinguishable from a human.
 A soulless zombie that lacks a soul.
 An imperfect zombie or imp-zombie that is like a p-zombie but has slightly different behavior than a regular human.  They are important in the context of the mind-evolution problem.
A zombie universe that is identical to our world in all physical ways, except no being in that world has qualia.

Zombie arguments
Zombie arguments often support lines of reasoning that aim to show that zombies are metaphysically possible in order to support some form of dualism – in this case the view that the world includes two kinds of substance (or perhaps two kinds of property): the mental and the physical. 

In contrast to dualism, in physicalism, material facts determine all other facts. Since any fact other than that of consciousness may be held to be the same for a p-zombie and for a normal conscious human, it follows that physicalism must hold that p-zombies are either not possible or are the same as normal humans.

The zombie argument is a version of general modal arguments against physicalism such as that of Saul Kripke. Further such arguments were notably advanced in the 1970s by Thomas Nagel (1970; 1974) and Robert Kirk (1974) but the general argument was most famously developed in detail by David Chalmers in The Conscious Mind (1996). 

According to Chalmers one can coherently conceive of an entire zombie world, a world physically indistinguishable from this world but entirely lacking conscious experience. The counterpart of every conscious being in our world would be a p-zombie. Since such a world is conceivable, Chalmers claims, it is metaphysically possible, which is all the argument requires. Chalmers states: "Zombies are probably not naturally possible: they probably cannot exist in our world, with its laws of nature." The outline structure of Chalmers' version of the zombie argument is as follows;

According to physicalism, all that exists in our world (including consciousness) is physical. 
Thus, if physicalism is true, a metaphysically possible world in which all physical facts are the same as those of the actual world must contain everything that exists in our actual world. In particular, conscious experience must exist in such a possible world.
Chalmers argues that we can conceive being outside of a world physically indistinguishable from our world but in which there is no consciousness (a zombie world). From this (so Chalmers argues) it follows that such a world is metaphysically possible. 
Therefore, physicalism is false. (The conclusion follows from 2. and 3. by modus tollens.)

The above is a strong formulation of the zombie argument. There are other formulations of the zombies-type argument which follow the same general form. The premises of the general zombies argument are implied by the premises of all the specific zombie arguments. 

A general zombies argument is in part motivated by potential disagreements between various anti-physicalist views. For example, an anti-physicalist view can consistently assert that p-zombies are metaphysically impossible but that inverted qualia (such as inverted spectra) or absent qualia (partial zombiehood) are metaphysically possible. Premises regarding inverted qualia or partial zombiehood can substitute premises regarding p-zombies to produce variations of the zombie argument. 

The metaphysical possibility of a physically indistinguishable world with either inverted qualia or partial zombiehood would imply that physical truths do not metaphysically necessitate phenomenal truths. 

To formulate the general form of the zombies argument, take the sentence 'P' to be true if and only if the conjunct of all microphysical truths of our world obtain, take the sentence 'Q' to be true if some phenomenal truth, that obtains in the actual world, obtains. The general argument goes as follows.

It is conceivable that P is true and Q is not true.
If it is conceivable that P is true and Q is not true then it is metaphysically possible that P is true and Q not true.
If it is metaphysically possible that P is true and Q is not true then physicalism is false.
Therefore, physicalism is false.

Q can be false in a possible world if any of the following obtains: (1) there exists at least one invert relative to the actual world (2) there is at least one absent quale relative to the actual world (3) all actually conscious beings are p-zombies (all actual qualia are absent qualia).

Another way to construe the zombie hypothesis is epistemically – as a problem of causal explanation, rather than as a problem of logical or metaphysical possibility. The "explanatory gap" – also called the "hard problem of consciousness" – is the claim that (to date) no one has provided a convincing causal explanation of how and why we are conscious. It is a manifestation of the very same gap that (to date) no one has provided a convincing causal explanation of how and why we are not zombies.

The philosophical zombie argument can also be seen through the counterfeit bill example brought forth by Amy Kind. Amy Kind’s example centers around the idea that you have to imagine a counterfeit 20 dollar bill was made to be exactly like an authentic 20 dollar bill. This is logically possible. And yet the counterfeit bill would not really have the same value. Like the critique against Descartes conceivability argument, are people really logically conceiving of zombies when they say they are? When philosophers claim that zombies are conceivable, they invariably underestimate the task of conception, and end up imagining something that violates their own definition. 

According to Amy Kind, in her book “Philosophy of Mind: the basics”>, The Zombie Argument can be put in this standard form from a dualist point of view:

Responses
Galen Strawson argues that it is not possible to establish the conceivability of zombies, so that the argument, lacking its first premise, can never get going.

Chalmers has argued that zombies are conceivable, saying "it certainly seems that a coherent situation is described; I can discern no contradiction in the description." 

Many physicalist philosophers have argued that this scenario eliminates itself by its description; the basis of a physicalist argument is that the world is defined entirely by physicality; thus, a world that was physically identical would necessarily contain consciousness, as consciousness would necessarily be generated from any set of physical circumstances identical to our own.

The zombie argument claims that one can tell by the power of reason that such a "zombie scenario" is metaphysically possible. Chalmers states; "From the conceivability of zombies, proponents of the argument infer their metaphysical possibility" and argues that this inference, while not generally legitimate, is legitimate for phenomenal concepts such as consciousness since we must adhere to "Kripke's insight that for phenomenal concepts, there is no gap between reference-fixers and reference (or between primary and secondary intentions)." 

That is, for phenomenal concepts, conceivability implies possibility. According to Chalmers, whatever is logically possible is also, in the sense relevant here, metaphysically possible.

Another response is the denial of the idea that qualia and related phenomenal notions of the mind are in the first place coherent concepts. Daniel Dennett and others argue that while consciousness and subjective experience exist in some sense, they are not as the zombie argument proponent claims. The experience of pain, for example, is not something that can be stripped off a person's mental life without bringing about any behavioral or physiological differences. Dennett believes that consciousness is a complex series of functions and ideas. If we all can have these experiences the idea of the p-zombie is meaningless.

Dennett argues that "when philosophers claim that zombies are conceivable, they invariably underestimate the task of conception (or imagination), and end up imagining something that violates their own definition". He coined the term "zimboes" – p-zombies that have second-order beliefs – to argue that the idea of a p-zombie is incoherent; "Zimboes thinkZ they are conscious, thinkZ they have qualia, thinkZ they suffer pains – they are just 'wrong' (according to this lamentable tradition), in ways that neither they nor we could ever discover!". 

Michael Lynch agrees with Dennett, arguing that the zombie conceivability argument forces us to either question whether or not we actually have consciousness or accept that zombies are not possible.  If zombies falsely believe they are conscious, how can we be sure we are not zombies?  We may believe we are experiencing conscious mental states when, in fact, we merely hold a false belief.  Lynch thinks denying the possibility of zombies is more reasonable than questioning our own consciousness.

Furthermore, when concept of self is deemed to correspond to physical reality alone (reductive physicalism), philosophical zombies are denied by definition. When a distinction is made in one's mind between a hypothetical zombie and oneself (assumed not to be a zombie), the hypothetical zombie, being a subset of the concept of oneself, must entail a deficit in observables (cognitive systems), a "seductive error" contradicting the original definition of a zombie.

Thomas Metzinger dismisses the argument as no longer relevant to the consciousness community, calling it a weak argument that covertly relies on the difficulty in defining "consciousness", calling it an "ill-defined folk psychological umbrella term". 

Verificationism states that, for words to have meaning, their use must be open to public verification. Since it is assumed that we can talk about our qualia, the existence of zombies is impossible. 

Artificial intelligence researcher Marvin Minsky saw the argument as circular. The proposition of the possibility of something physically identical to a human but without subjective experience assumes that the physical characteristics of humans are not what produces those experiences, which is exactly what the argument was claiming to prove. 

Richard Brown agrees that the zombie argument is circular. To show this, he proposes "", which are creatures nonphysically identical to people in every way and lacking phenomenal consciousness. If  existed, they would refute dualism because they would show that consciousness is not nonphysical, i.e., is physical. Paralleling the argument from Chalmers: It is conceivable that  exist, so it is possible they exist, so dualism is false. Given the symmetry between the zombie and  arguments, we cannot arbitrate the physicalism/dualism question a priori.

Similarly, Gualtiero Piccinini argues that the zombie conceivability argument is circular. Piccinini’s argument questions whether the possible worlds where zombies exist are accessible from our world. If physicalism is true in our world, then physicalism is one of the relevant facts about our world for determining whether a possible zombie world is accessible from our world.  Therefore, asking whether zombies are metaphysically possible in our world is equivalent to asking whether physicalism is true in our world. 

Stephen Yablo's (1998) response is to provide an error theory to account for the intuition that zombies are possible.  Notions of what counts as physical and as physically possible change over time so conceptual analysis is not reliable here. Yablo says he is "braced for the information that is going to make zombies inconceivable, even though I have no real idea what form the information is going to take."

The zombie argument is difficult to assess because it brings to light fundamental disagreements about the method and scope of philosophy itself and the nature and abilities of conceptual analysis. Proponents of the zombie argument may think that conceptual analysis is a central part of (if not the only part of) philosophy and that it certainly can do a great deal of philosophical work. However, others, such as Dennett, Paul Churchland and W.V.O. Quine, have fundamentally different views. For this reason, discussion of the zombie argument remains vigorous in philosophy.

Some accept modal reasoning in general but deny it in the zombie case. Christopher S. Hill and Brian P. Mclaughlin suggest that the zombie thought experiment combines imagination of a "sympathetic" nature (putting oneself in a phenomenal state) and a "perceptual" nature (imagining becoming aware of something in the outside world). Each type of imagination may work on its own, but they're not guaranteed to work when both used at the same time. Hence Chalmers's argument need not go through. 

Moreover, while Chalmers defuses criticisms of the view that conceivability can tell us about possibility, he provides no positive defense of the principle. As an analogy, the generalized continuum hypothesis has no known counterexamples, but this does not mean we must accept it. And indeed, the fact that Chalmers concludes we have epiphenomenal mental states that do not cause our physical behavior seems one reason to reject his principle.

Related thought experiments
Frank Jackson's Mary's room argument is based around a hypothetical scientist, Mary, who is forced to view the world through a black-and-white television screen in a black and white room. Mary is a brilliant scientist who knows everything about the neurobiology of vision. Even though Mary knows everything about color and its perception (e.g. what combination of wavelengths makes the sky seem blue), she has never seen color. If Mary were released from this room and were to experience color for the first time, would she learn anything new? Jackson initially believed this supported epiphenomenalism (mental phenomena are the effects, but not the causes, of physical phenomena) but later changed his views to physicalism, suggesting that Mary is simply discovering a new way for her brain to represent qualities that exist in the world.

Swampman is an imaginary character introduced by Donald Davidson. If Davidson goes hiking in a swamp and is struck and killed by a lightning bolt while nearby another lightning bolt spontaneously rearranges a bunch of molecules so that, entirely by coincidence, they take on exactly the same form that Davidson's body had at the moment of his untimely death then this being, 'Swampman', has a brain structurally identical to that which Davidson had and will thus presumably behave exactly like Davidson. He will return to Davidson's office and write the same essays he would have written, recognize all of his friends and family and so forth.

John Searle's Chinese room argument deals with the nature of artificial intelligence: it imagines a room in which a conversation is held by means of written Chinese characters that the subject cannot actually read, but is able to manipulate meaningfully using a set of algorithms. Searle holds that a program cannot give a computer a "mind" or "understanding", regardless of how intelligently it may make it behave. Stevan Harnad argues that Searle's critique is really meant to target functionalism and computationalism, and to establish neuroscience as the only correct way to understand the mind.

Physicist Adam Brown has suggested constructing a type of philosophical zombie using counterfactual quantum computation, a technique in which a computer is placed into a superposition of running and not running. If the program being executed is a brain simulation, and if one makes the further assumption that brain simulations are conscious, then the simulation can have the same output as a conscious system, yet not be conscious.

See also

 Begging the question
 Blindsight
 Causality
 Chinese Room
 Consciousness
 Dual-aspect theory
 Explanatory gap
 Functionalism (philosophy of mind)
 Hard problem of consciousness
 Inverted spectrum
 Map–territory relation
 Mind
 Mind-body problem
 Neutral monism
 NPC (meme)
 No true Scotsman
 Philosophy of mind
 Problem of other minds
 Quantum Night
 Reverse engineering
 Sentience
 Ship of Theseus
 Solipsism
 Turing test
 Vertiginous question
 Zombie Blues

References

Notes

Bibliography
Bergson, Henry. 1911. 'Life and Consciousness', Conference given at the university of Oxford. Oxford: 	1911. (https://archive.org/details/hibbertjournal10londuoft/page/32/mode/2up?view=theater)
 Chalmers, David. 1995. "Facing Up to the Problem of Consciousness", Journal of Consciousness Studies, vol. 2,  no. 3, pp. 200–219. Online PDF
 Chalmers, David. 1996. The Conscious Mind: In Search of a Fundamental Theory, New York and Oxford: Oxford University Press. Hardcover: , paperback: 
 Chalmers, David. 2003. "Consciousness and its Place in Nature", in the Blackwell Guide to the Philosophy of Mind, S. Stich and F. Warfield (eds.), Blackwell. Also in Philosophy of Mind: Classical and Contemporary Readings, D. Chalmers (ed.), Oxford, 2002. , Online PDF
 Chalmers, David. 2004. "Imagination, Indexicality, and Intensions", Philosophy and Phenomenological Research, vol. 68, no. 1. Online text 
Chalmers, David. 2010. "the character of consciousness", OUP
 Dennett, Daniel. 1995. "The Unimagined Preposterousness of Zombies", Journal of Consciousness Studies, vol. 2, no. 4, pp. 322–326. Online abstract
 Dennett, Daniel. 1999. "The Zombic Hunch: Extinction of an Intuition?", Royal Institute of Philosophy Millennial Lecture. Online text
 Kirk, Robert. 1974. "Sentience and Behaviour", Mind, vol. 83, pp. 43–60. 
 Kripke, Saul. 1972. "Naming and Necessity", in Semantics of Natural Language, ed. by D. Davidson and G. Harman, Dordrecht, Holland: Reidel, pp. 253–355. (Published as a book in 1980, Harvard University Press.)
 Nagel, Thomas. 1970. "Armstrong on the Mind", Philosophical Review, vol. 79, pp. 394–403. 
 Nagel, Thomas. 1974. "What Is it Like to Be a Bat?" Philosophical Review, vol. 83, pp. 435–450. 
 Thomas, N.J.T. 1998. "Zombie Killer", in S.R. Hameroff, A.W. Kaszniak, & A.C. Scott (eds.), Toward a Science of Consciousness II: The Second Tucson Discussions and Debates (pp. 171–177), Cambridge, MA: MIT Press. Online
 Yablo, Stephen. 2000. "Textbook Kripkeanism and the Open Texture of Concepts", Pacific Philosophical Quarterly, vol. 81, pp. 98–122. Online text

External links
 Online papers on philosophical zombies, by various authors, compiled by David Chalmers.
 Field Guide to the Philosophy of Mind 
 
 Skepdic entry on p-zombies
 A Chaospet comic on the subject of philosophical zombies
 On The Conceivability of Zombies Paper argues that Philosophical Zombies are not conceivable

Zombies
Thought experiments in philosophy of mind
Epistemology
Internalism and externalism
Hypothetical life forms